The Orpington by-election in 1962 is often described as the start of the Liberal Party revival in the United Kingdom.

Background
The by-election was caused by the appointment of Donald Sumner, the Conservative Member of Parliament for Orpington, as a county court judge.  The appointment was generally thought to be making way for Peter Goldman, who had worked with Iain Macleod on the Conservatives' previous election manifesto. The Conservatives had held the seat since its creation in 1945 and, in the 1959 general election, had easily retained it. Labour and the Liberals had each picked up just over 20% of the vote. Commentators therefore expected Goldman to achieve a comfortable victory.

The Liberal Party had reached its lowest ebb in the 1951 general election, gaining only 2.5% of the national vote and returning only six MPs. Signs of a revival were not seen until it won the 1958 Torrington by-election, its first gain at a by-election since Holland with Boston in 1929. The following year, however, Torrington was lost at the general election and, despite increasing its share of the vote to 5.9%, the party did not return more than six MPs. After the general election, its revival resumed as it took second place in several by-elections.

The Liberals had planned to put forward their candidate from the 1959 election, Jack Galloway, but selected local councillor Eric Lubbock after it was revealed that Galloway had technically been guilty of bigamy.

Campaign
During the campaign, Goldman attracted criticism for living outside the constituency and admitting that he had no plans to move into it. His close association with the Exchequer also meant his standing was damaged when the Conservative government was forced to announce a pay freeze (Selwyn Lloyd's "Pay Pause") for public sector workers that was seen, in particular, to penalise nurses.

The by-election was held on 14 March 1962. Despite the Conservatives' troubles, the near-22% swing from them to the Liberals surprised most analysts. Lubbock won a 7,855-vote majority and held the seat until 1970. The win boosted the Liberals' poll ratings but did not accelerate their resurgence.

Result

Previous election

References

External links 
British Parliamentary By Elections: Liberal Party campaign literature from the by-election
Richard Kimber's Political Science Resources

Orpington,1962
Orpington,1962
Orpington by-election
Orpington by-election
Orpington,1962
1960s in Kent
Orpington